Alla Montchak (born December 11, 1981), known professionally as Nikki Benz, is a Ukrainian-born American pornographic actress. She was also a 2010 Penthouse Pet who was selected as the 2011 Pet of the Year.

Early life
Benz was born in Mariupol, Ukrainian SSR, Soviet Union; her father's family is Canadian. At age seven, she immigrated to Canada with her parents. She was raised in Toronto. After living in the United States for several years, she became a U.S. citizen in February 2013.

Career

Benz worked as a swimsuit model and stripper prior to her porn career. She entered the adult film industry by e-mailing porn director Jim Gunn, who introduced her to Frank Kay, the president of Pleasure Productions. She signed with Pleasure Productions in January 2003 and made her first on-screen sex scene in Strap on Sally 20 with Gina Lynn, and her first boy-girl scene with Ben English in The Sweetest Thing. After completing her contract, Benz moved to Los Angeles and signed with Jill Kelly Productions in September 2004. Benz signed a contract with TeraVision in September 2005. She was the Penthouse Pet of the Month for April 2010, and the magazine's cover girl and feature in the May 2008 issue. Benz was named Penthouse Pet of the Year 2011.

In June 2016, Brazzers signed Benz to be its first brand ambassador to promote their products. Several months later, Benz alleged that she was assaulted on a shoot for the website. She alleged that the director of the scene, Tony T, choked her after she asked the shoot to be stopped. A representative for Tony T denied the charges, and Brazzers ended its relationship with him after the allegation. After the accusations, several other performers including Dana DeArmond, Carter Cruise, and Devon came forward with their stories about the director. Tony T and Ramon Nomar filed a lawsuit against Benz and Brazzers for defamation.

Appearances
Along with Lisa Ann and Sean Michaels, Benz co-hosted the XRCO Awards in April 2010. Benz has made several appearances on the FoxSports.com show Cubed, playing a wise-cracking, sports-savvy cleaning lady.

In 2012, Benz was featured in a video game, Saints Row: The Third – Penthouse Pack, released by Volition. She also was in a music video, Lose Yourself. In 2013, she appeared briefly in the film Pain and Gain.

She appears in the dramatic film My Trip Back to the Dark Side (2014), which was directed by filmmaker Shane Stanley.

Other ventures
Benz hosted a show on KSEX called Contract Superstars alongside Lacie Heart, Ashley Steele, Stormy Daniels, and Tyler Faith but quit citing "time constraints". She and fellow adult performer Alexis Texas decided to advocate for gender equality, supporting female toplessness by Times Square performers, by exposing their breasts in Times Square.

Toronto mayoral campaign
In May 2014, Benz announced her candidacy to run for mayor of the Canadian city of Toronto via her Twitter account. She decided to fight against Rob Ford for Toronto mayor. The announcement was subsequently covered by the Huffington Post, TMZ, and in a Playboy.com interview. The news also gained international attention via Yahoo France, Britain, and Finland.

On May 28, 2014, Benz tried to submit her application to run for Mayor of Toronto, but the city would not accept her application because her Ontario driver's license had already expired.  It was not known at the time whether she would reapply to run for mayor. In the Playboy interview, Benz discussed various campaign issues including gay rights, economic stimulation for the city, and public transportation. Her platform included supporting and raising funds for the Downtown Relief Line, a proposed addition to Toronto's mass transit system. She also commented on former mayor Rob Ford's substance abuse and his break from campaigning while he attended to his drug rehabilitation. In the interview, Benz cited her honesty and transparency, her love of her home town city, and concern for its people. She also vowed to donate half of her salary as mayor to a cause chosen by its citizens.

Awards and nominations

References

External links

 
 
 
 

1981 births
Living people
Soviet emigrants to Canada
Canadian people of Ukrainian descent
Canadian pornographic film actresses
Penthouse Pets
Penthouse Pets of the Year
Actresses from Toronto
American people of Ukrainian descent
American people of Canadian descent